The following is a list of Australian radio station callsigns beginning with the number 4, indicating radio stations in the state of Queensland.

Notes

Defunct Callsigns

 
Radio station callsigns, Queensland
Radio
Lists of radio stations in Australia